The House of Khuen von Belasi (originally Khuen, Khuon, Khun) is the name of an old and distinguished Austrian noble family originated from the County of Tyrol.

History 
The family starts late 13th century with Egon or Egino de Tramino ("dem Kühnen", meaning "the keen"). On 13 June 1542, Blasius Khuen became "Regimentsrat" of lower Austria and also geheimer Rat to the Emperor of Austria. From 1560 to 1568, he became upper Austrian chamberlain.

In 1573, Rudolf Khuen was titled Belasy von Gandeck, also Liechtenberg and Aur, Freiherr zu Neu-Lembach. Rudolf Khuen bought the county Gandegg in 1557.

Notable members of the Barons of Khuen von Belasi before 1622
Rudolf Khuen von Belasi (†1581 Vienna, since 1959 Prosector of Ferdinand I of Austria, later Geheimrat of Maximilian II. of Austria and Rudolf II. Titled to a Freiherr May, 8th of 1573
His son Johann Eusebius Freiherr Khuen von Belasi (†6. November 1622)
Johann Jakob Khuen von Belasi, *about 1515; †15. Mai 1586) Archbishop of Salzburg

Notable members of the Counts of Khuen von Belasi since 1622
Jakob Freiherr Khuen von Belasi zu Lichtenberg and Gandeck (†21. September 1639) nobled to Reichsgraf in 1640
Johann Franz Reichsgraf Khuen von Belasi (12. August 1649; †3. April 1702 Brixen), Prince-Bishop of Brixen

External links
 http://de.wikisource.org/wiki/ADB:Khuen_von_Belasy

Austrian noble families
 
Counts of the Holy Roman Empire